Love and Hate is a lost 1916 silent film directed by James Vincent and starring Bertha Kalich. It was produced and distributed by Fox Film Corporation.

Cast
Bertha Kalich - Helen Sterling
Stuart Holmes - George Howard
Kenneth Hunter - Robert Sterling
Madeleine Le Nard - Rita Lawson
Jane Lee - Willie Sterling
Katherine Lee - Myrtle Sterling

See also
1937 Fox vault fire

References

External links
 Love and Hate at IMDb.com

1916 films
American silent feature films
Lost American films
Fox Film films
Films directed by James Vincent
American black-and-white films
1910s American films